Javier Alejandro Jiménez Paris (born 27 May 2000) is an Aruban international footballer who plays as a midfielder for BSC Süd.

Career statistics

Club

Notes

International

References

2000 births
Living people
Aruban footballers
Aruba international footballers
Aruban expatriate footballers
Association football midfielders
SV Deportivo Nacional players
Rabat Ajax F.C. players
Expatriate footballers in Malta
Expatriate footballers in Germany
Aruba under-20 international footballers